Gray is an unincorporated community in Somerset County, Pennsylvania, United States. Gray has a post office, with ZIP code 15544.

References

Unincorporated communities in Somerset County, Pennsylvania
Unincorporated communities in Pennsylvania